In ring theory, a branch of mathematics, a radical of a ring is an ideal of "not-good" elements of the ring.

In the next few years several other radicals were discovered, of which the most important example is the Jacobson radical.

Definitions
In the theory of radicals, rings are usually assumed to be associative, but need not be commutative and need not have a multiplicative identity. In particular, every ideal in a ring is also a ring.

A radical class (also called radical property or just radical) is a class σ of rings possibly without identities, such that:

 the homomorphic image of a ring in σ is also in σ
 every ring R contains an ideal S(R) in σ that contains every other ideal of R that is in σ
 S(R/S(R)) = 0. The ideal S(R) is called the radical, or σ-radical, of R.

The study of such radicals is called torsion theory.

For any class δ of rings, there is a smallest radical class Lδ containing it, called the lower radical of δ. The operator L is called the lower radical operator.

A class of rings is called regular if every non-zero ideal of a ring in the class has a non-zero image in the class. For every regular class δ of rings, there is a largest radical class Uδ, called the upper radical of δ,  having zero intersection with δ. The operator U is called the upper radical operator.

A class of rings is called hereditary if every ideal of a ring in the class also belongs to the class.

Examples

The Jacobson radical
 

Let R be any ring, not necessarily commutative.  The Jacobson radical of R is the intersection of the annihilators of all simple right R-modules.

There are several equivalent characterizations of the Jacobson radical, such as:

J(R) is the intersection of the regular maximal right (or left) ideals of R.
J(R) is the intersection of all the right (or left) primitive ideals of R.
J(R) is the maximal right (or left) quasi-regular right (resp. left) ideal of R.

As with the nilradical, we can extend this definition to arbitrary two-sided ideals I by defining J(I) to be the preimage of J(R/I) under the projection map R → R/I.

If R is commutative, the Jacobson radical always contains the nilradical. If the ring R is a finitely generated Z-algebra, then the nilradical is equal to the Jacobson radical, and more generally: the radical of any ideal I will always be equal to the intersection of all the maximal ideals of R that contain I. This says that R is a Jacobson ring.

The Baer radical
The Baer radical of a ring is the intersection of the prime ideals of the ring R. Equivalently it is the smallest semiprime ideal in R. The Baer radical is the lower radical of the class of nilpotent rings.  Also called the "lower nilradical" (and denoted Nil∗R), the "prime radical", and the "Baer-McCoy radical".  Every element of the Baer radical is nilpotent, so it is a nil ideal.

For commutative rings, this is just the nilradical and closely follows the definition of the radical of an ideal.

The upper nil radical or Köthe radical
The sum of the nil ideals of a ring R is the upper nilradical Nil*R or Köthe radical and is the unique largest nil ideal of R. Köthe's conjecture asks whether any left nil ideal is in the nilradical.

Singular radical 
An element of a (possibly non-commutative ring) is called left singular if it annihilates an essential left ideal, that is, r is left singular if Ir = 0 for some essential left ideal I.  The set of left singular elements of a ring R is a two-sided ideal, called the left singular ideal, and is denoted . However, the singular radical of a Noetherian ring is always nilpotent.

The Levitzki radical
The Levitzki radical is defined as the largest locally nilpotent ideal, analogous to the Hirsch–Plotkin radical in the theory of groups.  If the ring is Noetherian, then the Levitzki radical is itself a nilpotent ideal, and so is the unique largest left, right, or two-sided nilpotent ideal.

The Brown–McCoy radical
The Brown–McCoy radical (called the strong radical in the theory of Banach algebras) can be defined in any of the following ways: 
 the intersection of the maximal two-sided ideals
 the intersection of all maximal modular ideals
 the upper radical of the class of all simple rings with identity

The Brown–McCoy radical is studied in much greater generality than associative rings with 1.

The von Neumann regular radical
A von Neumann regular ring is a ring A (possibly non-commutative without identity) such that for every a there is some b with  a = aba. The von Neumann regular rings form a radical class. It contains every matrix ring over a division algebra, but contains no nil rings.

The Artinian radical
The Artinian radical is usually defined for two-sided Noetherian rings as the sum of all right ideals that are Artinian modules. The definition is left-right symmetric, and indeed produces a two-sided ideal of the ring.

See also
Related uses of radical that are not radicals of rings:
 Radical of a module
 Kaplansky radical
 Radical of a bilinear form

References 

 

Ideals (ring theory)
Ring theory